Jim Ottaviani is an American writer who is the author of several comic books about the history of science. His best-known work, Two-Fisted Science: Stories About Scientists, features biographical stories about Galileo Galilei, Isaac Newton, Niels Bohr, and several stories about physicist Richard Feynman. He is also a librarian and has worked as a nuclear engineer.

Biography
Ottaviani has a background in science, earning a B.S. at the University of Illinois at Urbana-Champaign in 1986, followed by a master's degree in nuclear engineering from the University of Michigan in 1987. He worked for several years retrofitting and fixing nuclear power plants. Intrigued by the research component of his job, Ottaviani began taking library science courses at Drexel University, and in 1990 he enrolled in the Library and Information Science program at the University of Michigan. He earned his M.S. in information and library studies from Michigan in 1992. He spent several years working as a reference librarian at Michigan's Media Union Library. He now works at the University of Michigan Library as coordinator of Deep Blue, the university's institutional repository.

Ottaviani's interest in writing science-related comics was inspired by Richard Rhodes's book The Making of the Atomic Bomb. In discussing the book with comic book artist Steve Lieber, the two decided to write and illustrate a famous meeting between physicists Niels Bohr and Werner Heisenberg during World War II. That project expanded to include other stories from the history of science to become the graphic novel Two-Fisted Science, including stories written by Ottaviani and illustrated by a variety of artists.

Since the publication of Two-Fisted Science, Ottaviani has gone on to write several other comic books about scientists, including Dignifying Science (about women scientists), Fallout (about the creation of the atomic bomb), Suspended in Language (about physicist Niels Bohr) and Bone Sharps, Cowboys, and Thunder Lizards (about nineteenth century paleontologists). These works are all self-published by Ottaviani's own company, G. T. Labs, which he started in 1996. The company's name is an homage to General Techtronics Labs, the fictional company where comic book character Peter Parker was bitten by the radioactive spider that led to his becoming Spider-Man.

Two of Ottaviani's most recent works Levitation and Wire Mothers (published July 2007) are the beginning of a planned series on "the science of the unscientific." Levitation the physical and psychological aspects of stage magic. Wire Mothers is tells the story of psychologist Harry Harlow's work in the 1950s on importance of love and affection among primates, in contravention of then-prevailing theories put forward by the Behaviorist school of thought.<ref name="spurgeon_interview">Spurgeon, Tom. "A Short Interview With Jim Ottaviani, Janine Johnston and Dylan Meconis." The Comics Reporter. May 6, 2007.</ref>

In addition to his self-published work, Ottaviani has worked on two short comic books about orangutans, one of which was published by the Orangutan Foundation International. He also has two forthcoming comics in the works to be published by First Second Books, one on physicist Richard Feynman and another on three primatologists: Jane Goodall, Dian Fossey, and Biruté Galdikas.Carlson, Johanna Draper. "GT Labs news ." ComicsWorthReading.com. October 15, 2006.

On August 31, 2011, Ottaviani appeared on the Science Channel's Dark Matters: Twisted But True.

On November 15, 2013, First Second announced that it would publish Ottaviani's upcoming biography of Stephen Hawking with illustrations by Leland Myrick. In June 2014, Tor.com released Ottaviani and Leland Purvis' Alan Turing biography, The Imitation Game, for free online. An expanded, print version of the book appeared in 2016.

Awards
Ottaviani's 2001 graphic novel Fallout: J. Robert Oppenheimer, Leo Szilard, and the Political Science of the Atomic Bomb was nominated for the 2002 Ignatz Award for Outstanding Graphic Novel or Collection. Dignifying Science: Stories about Women Scientists was nominated for a 1999 Eisner Award and for the 2000  Lulu Award. The 2003 Quantum entanglement, spooky action at a distance, teleportation, and you was nominated for the 2004 Ignatz Award for Outstanding Minicomic. Ottaviani was also awarded a 1997 Xeric Foundation grant for Two-Fisted Science.

Bibliography
 Safecracker, (artist: Bernie Mireault) General Tektronics Labs, 1997, excerpted from Two-Fisted Science. Two-Fisted Science: Stories About Scientists, (various artists) General Tektronics Labs, 1997. . 
 Second edition, G. T. Labs, 2001. .
 Wild person in the woods (artist: Anne Timmons). Orangutan Foundation International, 1998.
 "Talking" orangutans in Borneo (by Nancy Briggs and Jim Ottaviani; illustrated by Anne Timmons), Orangutan Foundation International, 2000.
 Fallout: J. Robert Oppenheimer, Leo Szilard, and the Political Science of the Atomic Bomb, (various artists) G. T. Labs, 2001. . 
 Dignifying Science: stories about women scientists, (various artists) Second edition, G. T. Labs, 2003. .
 Quantum Entanglement, Spooky Action at a Distance, Teleportation, and You : a.k.a the Official G.T. Labs Guide to Teleportation via Quantum Entanglement and Spooky Action at a Distance (Including a Brief but Helpful Section on Why, Perhaps, You Should Not Try This at Home), (artist: Roger Langridge) G. T. Labs, 2003.
 Suspended In Language: Niels Bohr's Life, Discoveries, And The Century He Shaped, (artist: Leland Purvis) G.T. Labs, 2004. . 
 Bone Sharps, Cowboys, and Thunder Lizards: A Tale of Edward Drinker Cope, Othniel Charles Marsh, and the Gilded Age of Paleontology (artist: Big Time Attic), G. T. Labs, 2005. .
 Levitation: Physics and Psychology in the Service of Deception (artist: Janine Johnston), G.T. Labs, 2007: 
 Wire Mothers: Harry Harlow and the Science of Love (artist: Dylan Meconis), G.T. Labs, 2007: 
 T-Minus: The Race to the Moon (artists: Zander Cannon & Kevin Cannon), Aladdin, 2009: 
 Feynman (artist: Leland Myrick), First Second, 2011: 
 Primates: The Fearless Science of Jane Goodall, Dian Fossey, and Biruté Galdikas, illustrated by Maris Wicks, First Second, 2013, 
 [http://www.tor.com/stories/2014/06/the-imitation-game-jim-ottaviani-leland-purvis The Imitation Game, illustrated by Leland Purvis, Tor.com, 2014.
 The Imitation Game: Alan Turing Decoded (artist: Leland Purvis), Harry N. Abrams, 2016, 
Hawking (artist: Leland Myrick), First Second, 2019, 
Naturalist (by Edward O. Wilson; adapted by Jim Ottaviani and C.M. Butzer; artist: C.M. Butzer), Island Press, 2020 
Astronauts: Women on the Final Frontier (artist: Maris Wicks), First Second, 2020, ISBN 9781626728776
Einstein (artist: Jerel Dye), First Second, 2022, ISBN 9781626728769

Footnotes

References
 Cowboys, Dinosaurs, Heisenberg and Bohr: Jim Ottaviani—an interview by Carol Fox in the 'Sequential Tart' web zine.
 A Short Interview with Jim Ottaviani—in The Comics Reporter, June 12, 2005; focuses on the business aspects of self-publishing and marketing niche comics, and on Bone Sharps, Cowboys, and Thunder Lizards
 Holy Evolution, Darwin! Comics Take On Science, by Neda Ulaby on NPR's Morning Edition. Includes interviews with Jim Ottaviani and biologist Jay Hosler. Aired Feb. 14, 2005.

External links
 G T Labs website—Jim Ottaviani's publishing company
 Video interview with Jim Ottaviani—Ottaviani talks about non-fiction comics with Jim and Mary Russell at the 2006 Snap! Comics Arts Festival
 Several reviews of Ottaviani's works at ComicsWorthReading.com
 Ottaviani's story of doing the Dark Matters TV show
 Review of Ottaviani's book Feynman

American comics writers
American writers of Italian descent
American librarians
University of Illinois alumni
University of Michigan College of Engineering alumni
University of Michigan staff
Living people
Year of birth missing (living people)
American historians of science